The Columbia 32 is an American sailboat that was designed by William H. Tripp Jr. and first built in 1975.

The boat was derived from the shorter Columbia 30.

The Columbia 32 design was previously sold by Coronado Yachts as the Coronado 32, starting in 1973 and was later sold by Sailcrafter as the Sailcrafter 32, commencing in 1977. It was also developed into the Watkins 32 in 1982.

Production
The design was built by Columbia Yachts in the United States from 1975 to 1976, with 80 boats completed, but it is now out of production.

Design
The Columbia 32 is a recreational keelboat, built predominantly of fiberglass, with wood trim. It has a masthead sloop rig, a raked stem, an angled transom, a skeg-mounted  rudder controlled by a tiller and a fixed fin keel. It displaces  and carries  of ballast.

The boat is fitted with a gasoline inboard motor, driving a two-bladed bronze propeller, for docking and maneuvering.

Below decks the design has a main salon featuring a folding, drop-down table with two settees that can be  converted into upper and lower pilot berths. The galley has a  capacity icebox and a stainless steel sink. The head is fully enclosed.

See also
List of sailing boat types

Related development
Watkins 32

Similar sailboats
Aloha 32
Bayfield 30/32
Beneteau 323
C&C 32
Contest 32 CS
Douglas 32
Hunter 32 Vision
Hunter 326
Mirage 32
Morgan 32
Ontario 32
Nonsuch 324
Ranger 32

References

Keelboats
1970s sailboat type designs
Sailing yachts
Sailboat type designs by William H. Tripp Jr.
Sailboat types built by Columbia Yachts